The Alliance was a left-wing political party in New Zealand. It was formed at the end of 1991 by the linking of four smaller parties. The Alliance positioned itself as a democratic socialist alternative to the centre-left New Zealand Labour Party. It was influential throughout the 1990s, but suffered a major setback after its founder and leader, Jim Anderton, left the party in 2002, taking with him several of its members of parliament (MPs). After the remaining MPs lost their seats in the 2002 general election, some commentators predicted the demise of the party.

The Alliance stood candidates in the 2005 general election but won less than 1% of the party vote. It contested Auckland City Council elections under the City Vision banner, in concert with the New Zealand Labour Party and Green Party. The Alliance ran 15 electorate candidates and a total of 30 candidates on the party list in the 2008 general election, increasing its party vote marginally from that in 2005. It was deregistered (can no longer contest for the party vote) at its own request on 26 May 2015.

Policies
A democratic socialist party, the Alliance supported free education, free healthcare, full employment and the maintenance of the welfare state. Its policy platform emphasized women's rights, environmentalism, and Māori rights. It supported New Zealand's nuclear-free policy and opposed military interventionism, particularly during the war in Afghanistan. The Alliance supported proportional representation for elections.

The Alliance advocated a progressive tax, which would mean a higher tax rate for wealthier people and a lower rate for poorer people. It also supported the removal of the Goods and Services Tax, seeing the tax as unfair because the amount paid does not vary according to the purchaser's ability to afford it; it advocated replacing this with a financial transaction tax, or Tobin tax.

History

Foundation
The Alliance was formed at the end of 1991 as an alliance of four parties. The largest of the four was the NewLabour Party (not associated with the later New Labour movement in the UK), established by former Labour Party politician Jim Anderton. The oldest was the Democratic Party (originally known as the Social Credit Political League, and dedicated to Social Credit policies). The others were Mana Motuhake (a Māori party) and the Greens (an environmentalist party).

Until his departure from Labour in 1989, Anderton had been the most vocal Labour MP in his criticism of his party's new direction. Led by Roger Douglas, the Minister of Finance, Labour had adopted radical policies of economic liberalisation, free trade, and privatisation of state assets – sharply in contrast both with the party's background and its campaign promises. This was deeply unpopular both with a section of the public and with ordinary members, but Douglas and his allies, without effective constraint by Prime Minister David Lange, pressed on with the reforms. Anderton, despite heavy pressure from the party authorities, refused to vote in favour of the measures, and eventually quit the party. He contested the 1990 election under the banner of NewLabour, a party he quickly established. He successfully retained his electorate seat, becoming the first MP to leave a party and not lose their position in the next elections.

NewLabour, the Democrats, and Mana Motuhake, all of which opposed the platform set out by Douglas, gradually began to work together to fight their common political opposition. The Greens, who had policies and electoral support, but not party organisation, also took notice. Initially, this co-operation was limited, but expanded after a joint candidate was successful in an Auckland local-body election. In two concurrent by-elections on the Auckland Regional Council (ARC) in November 1991 the parties coalesced around a single candidate in each race; Bruce Jesson of NewLabour in the Panmure Ward and Ruth Norman from the Greens in the Glenfield Ward. Both were successful giving a huge boost in confidence and publicity to the incipient party.

Original Alliance logo

On 1 December 1991, NewLabour, the Greens, the Democrats, and Mana Motuhake formally agreed to establish the Alliance as an official party. This established the three original pillars of Alliance policy – left-wing economics (represented by NewLabour and the Democrats), environmentalism (represented by the Greens), and Māori issues (represented by Mana Motuhake).

Shortly after the official establishment of the Alliance, a small splinter group from the National Party applied to join. This group, known as the Liberal Party (not to be confused with the original Liberal Party), consisted of two former National Party MPs who were disillusioned with the continuation of Douglas's policies by National's Ruth Richardson. The Liberals became the fifth member of the Alliance in June 1992. The addition of the two Liberal MPs (Gilbert Myles and Hamish MacIntyre) together with Anderton gave the party more of a presence in parliament. Later at the Alliance's inaugural party conference in November 1992 Anderton was officially confirmed as party leader and members elected Sandra Lee of Mana Motuhake and Jeanette Fitzsimons from the Greens as co-deputy leaders.

There were also discussions regarding the Alliance's links with Winston Peters, a former National MP who founded the New Zealand First party. Peters was also opposed to the economic reforms being undertaken, was hostile towards big business, and claimed to support ordinary New Zealanders, but was also highly conservative in his social policies. In particular, his views on immigration were incompatible with the Alliance's belief in multiculturalism. There were also problems regarding who would lead any merged entity – both the Alliance's Anderton and New Zealand First's Peters were well regarded for standing up to their old parties, leaving it unclear which of them should be senior. (Some have also claimed that neither Anderton nor Peters would accept being ranked second – both politicians are sometimes accused by their critics of being egotistical and controlling). Regardless of the reason, the Alliance and New Zealand First did not move together. As a result, Myles and several other top figures in the Liberal Party left the Alliance and joined with New Zealand First instead.

Early electoral performance
In 1992, the Alliance contested a by-election in the electorate of Tamaki. The former stronghold of Robert Muldoon, a conservative National Party leader, Tamaki was not regarded as an easy run for the Alliance. It was, therefore, surprising when the Alliance went to first place in several polls and its candidate (Chris Leitch of the Democrats) nearly won the seat, finishing a close second and pushing Labour into third place.

In February 1992 the Alliance won a third by-election on the ARC when Mike Lee of NewLabour won the Auckland Central Ward giving the party further momentum. Later that year, the Alliance made further gains in the 1992 local-body elections campaigning on a platform of halting the sale of public utilities. After a strong campaign the party gained control of the ARC's services trust and was able to cease sales. These two performances helped establish the Alliance as a significant threat to the major parties.

In the 1993 election, the Alliance gained 18% of the vote. However, the electoral system meant that the party only won two seats – one delivered by Jim Anderton, and the other by Sandra Lee in Auckland. Occurring at the same time as this election, however, was the referendum which introduced the mixed-member proportional (MMP) representation electoral system, making it much easier for smaller parties to get representation. The Alliance was a strong supporter of this change.

In 1994, Jim Anderton left the leadership of the Alliance, citing family reasons. Sandra Lee was placed in charge of the party. Later, however, Anderton was persuaded to return, and resumed the leadership.

Under MMP
In the 1996 election, the Alliance gained 10% of the vote. Under the new electoral system, this secured the party thirteen MPs. New Zealand First, however, had obtained seventeen MPs, and held the balance of power between Labour and National. Eventually, New Zealand First leader Winston Peters opted to form a coalition with National, leaving both Labour and the Alliance in opposition.

The Labour Party, now led by Helen Clark, had moved away from the policies of Roger Douglas — both Douglas and his strongest supporter, Richard Prebble, had left Labour to found the ACT party, and Clark's more traditional faction had taken over. This allowed a gradual reconciliation between Labour and the Alliance, a process assisted by the impression that lack of cooperation had cost both parties support. Eventually, this led to an agreement between the two parties, with both sides agreeing to cooperate in forming a government should election results allow it.

In 1997, the Greens decided that they would leave the Alliance at the next election, believing that they could perform better individually. Other developments in the Alliance's makeup included the formal dissolution of both the NewLabour Party and the Liberal Party, with their members becoming members of the Alliance as a whole rather than of any specific constituent party. This left the Democrats and Mana Motuhake as the only parts of the Alliance with distinct identities.

In the 1999 election, the Alliance gained around 8% of the vote, giving it ten seats. This, combined with Labour's forty-nine seats and some support from the Greens, was enough to form a coalition government. Jim Anderton became Deputy Prime Minister, and three other Alliance MPs gained positions in Cabinet. The Alliance claims to have made a number of significant achievements while in government, citing (among other things) the creation of the Ministry of Economic Development, the lifting of the minimum wage, a change in funding systems for schools, and abolition of market rents for state housing. The party also claims to have exerted an important general influence over other governmental decisions.
2003 Alliance logo

Split
Towards the end of the parliamentary term, however, internal tensions began to grow within the Alliance. This was partly driven by the party's low poll ratings, which were often blamed on perceived "subservience" to Labour. In particular, many members of the party organisation were less willing to support Labour than the party's MPs were, leading to a rift between parliamentary leader Anderton and party president Matt McCarten.

Eventually, Anderton decided to leave the Alliance and establish a new party. However, rules regarding changes of party allegiance meant that Anderton and his allies could not officially resign from the Alliance without also resigning from parliament, which they were unwilling to do. This led to the awkward situation of Anderton and his allies technically remaining part of the Alliance while actually operating outside of it. The conflict within the Alliance was one of the reasons cited by Helen Clark for her calling the election several months early in 2002.

Anderton, along with three other Alliance MPs, established the Progressive Coalition Party (later just the Progressive Party). Three Alliance MPs, led by Laila Harré, chose to remain with the Alliance. The remaining three MPs (two supporting Anderton, one supporting Harré) decided not to stand for parliament again. The Democrats, one of the two Alliance components still having a separate identity, chose to follow Anderton, while Mana Motuhake, the other, chose to stay. Labour was largely successful in avoiding being drawn into the dispute.

Decline
In the 2002 election, the Alliance and the Progressives competed against each other. The Alliance, believing that it would struggle to reach 5% (the threshold for a party being awarded representation proportional to its support), needed to win an electorate seat to gain entry to parliament. In both seats, however, the Alliance came second, losing each time to a Labour candidate, and so failed to gain parliamentary representation. In the list vote, the party failed to meet the threshold, gaining only 1.27% of the Party vote.

After the election, Mana Motuhake chose to leave the Alliance. This left the Alliance without any component parties – all members are now simply members of the Alliance as a whole.

Laila Harré stepped down as the party's leader on 30 November 2003, and was replaced by Matt McCarten, the party president who clashed with Anderton. McCarten advocated a policy which would see the Alliance focus less on electoral activity and more on playing a co-ordinating role—he has been a particularly strong advocate of working with the new Māori Party, which the Alliance had been involved with and practically supported during Tariana Turia's by-election campaign and the Maori Party launch. There was a debate within the Alliance, given the poll ratings of less than 1%, as to whether the Alliance should contest the list vote in the 2005 election, or instead only stand in electorate seats and encourage its supporters to use their list vote to support the Greens or the Māori Party. Jill Ovens, a former candidate and the new party president, was critical of McCarten's support of the Māori Party, saying that working both for the Alliance and the Māori Party at the same time represented a conflict of interest and resigned at one stage over the issue (Ovens subsequently joined the Labour Party in 2006). When no agreement could be reached on the electoral strategy McCarten and Harré disassociated themselves from the Alliance. Gerard Hehir, the outgoing General Secretary, informed the Electoral Commission that the Alliance no longer had the five hundred financial members required for registration. In late 2004 McCarten was replaced as leader by two co-leaders, Jill Ovens and Paul Piesse and the party's remaining membership voted to contest the list vote. In the 2005 election, the Alliance gained only 0.07% of the Party vote, placing 12th of the parties.

Following its poor showing in the 2005 election, the Alliance continued after their 2005 conference with two co-leaders Paul Piesse and Len Richards.

At the 2006 conference held in Wellington, no co-leaders were elected with the party deciding to concentrate on internal reorganisation. Victor Billot was elected president. At the 2007 national conference, held in Dunedin, two co-leaders were elected, Victor Billot and Kay Murray, with Paul Piesse returning to his former role as Party President. Speakers at the 2007 national conference included political commentator Chris Trotter and publisher Jack Yan. The Alliance stated its intention to run a list of candidates and electorate candidates in the 2008 general election. In April 2008 the party had between 500 and 600 members.

During the process of regroupment since the 2005 election the Alliance has reaffirmed its role as a broad left-wing political party committed to contesting both electorate seats and a party list. The party continues to release an annual alternative budget, prepared by the Alliance spokesperson on tax, the academic and intelligence researcher Jim Flynn. In 2008 the Alliance adopted a new logo designed by Jack Yan & Associates to signal the changes it has undergone and its intention for renewal and rebuilding.

In the 2008 election the Alliance fielded candidates in all major New Zealand centres, contesting 15 electorate seats and running a party list of 30 candidates under the co-leaders Kay Murray and Andrew McKenzie. The party managed to marginally improve its party vote to 1,721, amounting to 0.08 percent of the party vote and placing the Alliance 7th out of 12 extra-parliamentary parties. The Alliance candidate for Dunedin North, Victor Billot, gathered 448 electorate votes, placing him 6th in that electorate.

After the election of the fifth National government on 8 November 2008, the Alliance pledged to "play a leading role in resisting the attacks against public services, workers, beneficiaries and students that will be a feature of the new National Government."

The party unsuccessfully contested the 2011 election, gaining just 1,069 party votes, the lowest of any registered party. It did not nominate a list for the 2014 election, and nominated only a single electorate candidate: Mary O'Neill in Napier in which she came fifth with 59 votes.

The party was formally deregistered with the Electoral Commission at its own request on 26 May 2015. Without registration, the party cannot contest the party vote. , the party's website remains online with an active blog. The website describes a conference planned for August 2016 but it is unclear if this went ahead.
 
In 2020, the former Alliance MP Phillida Bunkle wrote an essay for Newsroom about her time in the party, in which she made allegations of a culture of bullying and misuse of funds, and of disruptive power-play by an internal grouping she called "the Faction."

Electoral results (1993–2014)

People

Leaders
Jim Anderton (1991–1994)
Sandra Lee (1994–1995)
Jim Anderton (1995–2002)
Laila Harré (2002–2003)
Matt McCarten (2003–2004)
Jill Ovens and Paul Piesse (2005–2006)
Len Richards and Paul Piesse (2006)
 Party President and spokesperson Victor Billot (2006–2007)
Victor Billot and Kay Murray (2007–2008)
Andrew McKenzie and Kay Murray (2008–2012)
Kay Murray and Kevin Campbell (2012–2015)

MPs

See also

:Category:Alliance (New Zealand political party) politicians
New Zealand Green Party
Socialism in New Zealand
Politics of New Zealand

References

Further reading

External links

Alliance

1991 establishments in New Zealand
2015 disestablishments in New Zealand
Defunct political parties in New Zealand
Political parties disestablished in 2015
Political parties established in 1991
Socialist parties in New Zealand